Atrophic vaginitis is inflammation of the vagina as a result of tissue thinning due to not enough estrogen. Symptoms may include pain with sex, vaginal itchiness or dryness, and an urge to urinate or burning with urination. It generally does not resolve without ongoing treatment. Complications may include urinary tract infections.

The lack of estrogen typically occurs following menopause. Other causes may include when breastfeeding or as a result of specific medications. Risk factors include smoking. Diagnosis is typically based on symptoms.

Treatment is generally with estrogen cream applied to the vagina. Other measures that may help include vaginal lubricants. It is recommended that soaps and other irritants are avoided. About half of postmenopausal women are affected. Many however are not being treated. Women often report reduced enjoyment in sex as well as life generally.

Signs and symptoms 

After menopause the vaginal epithelium changes and becomes a few layers thick. Many of the signs and symptoms that accompany menopause occur in atrophic vaginitis. Genitourinary symptoms include
 dryness
 pain
 itching
 burning
 soreness
 pressure
 white discharge
 malodorous discharge due to infection
 painful sexual intercourse
 bleeding after intercourse
 painful urination
 blood in the urine
 increased urinary frequency
 incontinence
 increased susceptibility to infections
 decreased vaginal lubrication
 urinary tract infections
 painful urination
 difficulty sitting
 difficulty wiping

Diagnosis 
Since women can have signs and symptoms that could be attributed to other causes, diagnosis is based upon the symptoms that cannot be better accounted for by another diagnosis. Lab tests usually do not provide information that will aid in diagnosing. A visual exam is useful. The observations of the following may indicate lower estrogen levels: little pubic hair, loss of the labial fat pad, thinning and resorption of the labia minora, and the narrowing of the vaginal opening. An internal exam will reveal the presence of low vaginal muscle tone, the lining of the vagina appears smooth, shiny, pale with loss of folds. The cervical fornices may have disappeared and the cervix can appear flush with the top of the vagina. Inflammation is apparent when the vaginal lining bleeds easily and appears swollen. The vaginal pH will be measured at 4.5 and higher.

Treatment 
Symptoms of genitourinary syndrome of menopause (GSM) will unlikely be resolved without treatment. Women may have many or a few symptoms so treatment is provided that best suits each woman. If other health problems are also present, these can be taken into account when determining the best course of treatment. For those who have symptoms related to sexual activities, a lubricant may be sufficient. If both urinary and genital symptoms exist, local, low-dose estrogen therapy can be effective. Those women who are survivors of hormone-sensitive cancer may need to be treated more cautiously. Some women can have symptoms that are widespread and may be at risk for osteoporosis. Estrogen and adjuvants may be best.

Topical treatment with estrogen is effective when the symptoms are severe and relieves the disruption in pH to restore the microbiome of the vagina. When symptoms include those related to the urinary system, systematic treatment can be used. Recommendations for the use of the lowest effective dose for the shortest duration  help to prevent adverse endometrial effects.

Some treatments have been developed more recently. These include selective estrogen receptor modulators, vaginal dehydroepiandrosterone, and laser therapy. Other treatments are available without a prescription such as vaginal lubricants and moisturizers. Vaginal dilators may be helpful. Since GSM may also cause urinary problems related to pelvic floor dysfunction, a woman may benefit from pelvic floor strengthening exercises. Women and their partners have reported that estrogen therapy resulted in less painful sex, more satisfaction with sex, and an improvement in their sex life.

Epidemiology

Up to 50% of postmenopausal women have at least some degree of vaginal atrophy. It is likely to be underdiagnosed and undertreated.

Terminology 
Vulvovaginal atrophy, and atrophic vaginitis have been the preferred terms for this condition and cluster of symptoms until recently. These terms are now regarded as inaccurate in describing changes to the entire genitourinary system occurring after menopause. The term atrophic vaginitis suggests that the vagina is inflamed or infected. Though this may be true, inflammation and infection are not the major components of postmenopausal changes to the vagina. The former terms do not describe the negative effects on the lower urinary tract which can be the most troubling symptoms of menopause for women. Genitourinary syndrome of menopause (GSM) was determined to be more accurate than vulvovaginal atrophy by two professional societies.  The term atrophic vaginitis does not reflect the related changes of the labia, clitoris, vestibule, urethra and bladder.

Research 
The FDA has approved the use of lasers in the treatment of many disorders. The treatment of GSM is not specifically mentioned in the list of disorders by the United States' Food and Drug Administration (FDA) but laser treatments have had success. Larger studies are still needed. The laser treatment works by resurfacing the vaginal epithelium and activating growth factors that increases blood flow, deposition of collagen and the thickness of the vaginal lining. Women treated with laser therapy reported diminished symptoms of dryness, burning, itching, pain during sexual intercourse, and painful urination. Few adverse effects were noted.

In 2018, the FDA issued a warning that lasers and other high energy devices were not approved for this application and it had received multiple reports of injuries.

References

External links 

Menopause
Inflammations
Noninflammatory disorders of female genital tract
Vaginal diseases
Wikipedia medicine articles ready to translate